Gurjinder Singh is an Indian football player who plays as a defender for I-League team Pune FC.

External links
 http://www.indianfootball.com/en/statistic/player/detail/playerId/584 
 http://goal.com/en-india/people/india/21736/gurjinder-singh 

Indian footballers
1987 births
Living people
Chirag United Club Kerala players
Association football defenders
Footballers from Punjab, India